Legal Help Desk (abbreviated as Legal HD) is a legal-consulting public affairs show that aired on CNN Philippines since November 26, 2012. It is hosted by Atty. Karen Jimeno.

See also
Solar Entertainment Corporation
Solar TV Network
Talk TV (Philippines) (the former name of Solar News Channel)
Solar News and Current Affairs
Solar Daybreak
Solar Newsday
Solar Network News
Solar Nightly News
Solar Headlines

Philippine legal television series
CNN Philippines original programming
CNN Philippines News and Current Affairs
English-language television shows
2012 Philippine television series debuts
2016 Philippine television series endings